Puckaway Lake also referred to as Lake Puckaway is a lake in Green Lake County and Marquette County, Wisconsin.

History
In 1673, French explorer Jacques Marquette, made a passage through the Fox–Wisconsin Waterway from Green Bay to the Mississippi River. Travelling through Puckaway Lake, he stated "the route is broken by so many swamps and small lakes that it is easy to lose one'sway, especially as the river is so full of wild rice that it is difficult to find the channel." Puckaway Lake is a natural formed lake however, the water level has been raised. In 1897, a lock and dam was built on the Fox River by the United States Army Corps of Engineers, eight miles downstream from the lake near Princeton. This was done with hopes of raising the water level enough for commercial use of the river. By 1922, it was realized that this would not be feasible, and the lock was decommissioned however the dam remains.

Recreation
There are seven public boat landings around the lake.

Fishing
Recreational fishing is frequent on Puckaway Lake. The Wisconsin Department of Natural Resources lists six different species of fish in the lake: Musky, Panfish, Largemouth Bass, Northern Pike, Walleye and Catfish. In 1952, the state record  northern pike was caught on Puckaway Lake.

Invasive Species
First observed in 1984, invasive species have been found in Puckaway Lake. There are Brittle Waternymph, Curly-Leaf Pondweed, Eurasian Water-Milfoil, Hybrid Eurasian / Northern Water-Milfoil, and Viral Hemorrhagic Septicemia. To stop the spread of invasive species in the Fox River Waterway, multiple locks have been permanently closed. This has been done to prevent other invasive species from the Great Lakes.

See also
List of lakes of Wisconsin

References

Lakes of Green Lake County, Wisconsin